{{Speciesbox
|genus=Dracaena
|species=zeylanica
|authority=(L.) Mabb.<ref name="POWO">{{Cite web |title=Dracaena zeylanica (L.) Mabb. |work=Plants of the World Online |publisher=Royal Botanic Gardens, Kew |url=https://powo.science.kew.org/taxon/urn:lsid:ipni.org:names:77164236-1 |access-date=2023-02-08}}</ref>
|synonyms=
 
|synonyms_ref=
}}Dracaena zeylanica is a species of flowering plant in the family Asparagaceae, native to southern India and Sri Lanka. It is better known under the synonym Sansevieria zeylanica.

Misidentifications
Early in the 20th century, Dracaena trifasciata was incorrectly called Sansevieria zeylanica in the literature. Non-variegated forms of Dracaena trifasciata are still often traded as Sansevieria zeylanica, but the true Dracaena zeylanica is poorly known and uncommon in cultivation.Dracaena zeylanica is a leafier plant (10-16 leaves per rosette, versus generally 2–4 in Dracaena trifasciata), and its leaves lack a petiole, instead becoming only slightly narrower at the base. In D. trifasciata'', leaves become narrower and thickened towards the bottom, forming a concave channel at the base of the leaves.

References

zeylanica
Flora of India
Flora of Sri Lanka